Northern Communal Cemetery is one of the largest cemeteries in Poland and Europe, located in Młociny and Wólka Węglowa in the Bielany district of Warsaw, Poland. The site for the cemetery was established in the 1960s at the northern outskirts of the city and partly in the area of the village of Wólka Węglowa (hence the colloquial name Cemetery in Wólka, Cmentarz na Wólce). The cemetery was opened in 1973 and so far nearly 180,000 of the dead have been buried here.

Some notable burials
A few of the notables buried here are:

 Maria Bogucka
 Zofia Czerwińska
 Piotr Grudziński
 Marcin Kołodyński
 Marta Mirska
 Hubert Wagner

Collective graves 

 The grave of the victims of the plane crash in the Kabaty Woods on May 9, 1987
 The grave of the victims of the plane crash in Okęcie on March 14, 1980
 War quarters of German soldiers

References

External links 
 Cemetery website

Bielany
Cemeteries in Warsaw